Kaithalkuchi is a census village in Nalbari district, Assam, India. As per the 2011 Census of India, Kaithalkuchi village has a total population of 3,831 people including 1,966 males and 1,865 females with a literacy rate of 81.39%.

Kaithalkuchi railway station 
The Kaithalkuchi railway station is the primary method of travel by the nearby villagers.

The Kaithalkuchi railway station code is KTCH. Details about trains and timings are in the following table.

References 

Villages in Nalbari district